Tic Tac is a brand of small, hard candy.

Tic tac or Tic Tac may also refer to:

 Tic-tac (horse racing), a signalling method used by bookmakers
 Tic Tac (film), a 1997 Swedish thriller
 Tic Tac (musician), a Ghanaian hiplife musician
 Tic tac bass, a method of playing baritone guitar
 Tic&Tac, a 1980 album by the jazz fusion band Area
 Tic Tac (TV series), a Chilean telenovela
 Tic Tac UFO videos, a colloquial term to refer to the Pentagon UFO videos

See also 

 Tic-tac-toe, a pencil-and-paper game also known as noughts and crosses
 "Tic, Tic Tac", a 1997 Portuguese language song by Carrapicho
 Tick! Tack!, a 2005 visual novel by Navel
 Tiktak, a Finnish music group
 Tik Tak, a Belgian children's television programme
 Tick tock (disambiguation)